Kateřina Neumannová (born 15 February 1973) is a Czech retired cross-country skier. She won an Olympic gold medal in the 2006 Winter Olympics, in the 30 km freestyle event. She is one of five cross country skiers to have competed at six Olympics.

She was also the first Czech woman to appear in both a Summer and Winter Olympics, having participated in the mountain biking event at the 1996 Summer Olympics.

Neumannová retired after the 2006-07 World Cup season.

Career overview
She was a flatwater canoeist and downhill skier before moving to cross country skiing at sixteen. Neumannová made her first appearance in the Winter Olympics in 1992 in Albertville. Her goal was only to gain experience. However, in all races (both individual and relay) she belonged to the best Czechoslovak athletes. Two years later, in Lillehammer, she was already among the best. She was 8th in 5 km classical and 6th in combination with 10 km free.

Her training during summer involved riding mountain bike and when the sport become popular she decided to race in it. Thanks to her strong muscles she quickly achieved successes. In 1995, she won a bronze medal at the European Championships, and she also qualified for the 1996 Summer Olympics in Atlanta.

Although cross-country skiing remained her main sport and her summer training was usually lighter she took preparations for Atlanta seriously. "This time I left out the pleasant period and started abruptly. Thanks to it I achieved results in athletic tests that I last run in junior categories," she said before the Olympics. But her preparations were not in the best conditions. She practised in cold weather in Šumava while great heat was expected for the Atlanta race.
On 31 July 1996, she became the first Czech female athlete to compete on both Winter and Summer Olympics when starting in the mountain bike race at the Georgia International Horse Park in Conyers, Georgia, United States. But the race itself was a horror for her. She fell off the bike early in the race. "I overrun about 15 racers but then a terrible crisis came upon me. I did not race anymore, I just wanted to finish," she described the race. She mainly complained about the terrible heat and said it was one of her worst experiences.

First major medal
Neumannová started the 1996/1997 season with a fourth place in the World Cup opener. The race took place in Kiruna and was run on 5 km free. Neumannová was content with the result but complained about soft snow she did not like. "If the track was more firm, I believe I would stand on the platform", she commented. At the end of the year she clearly dominated the Czech Championships on 5 km free and 10 km classic. She commented it was mainly training for her as the main goal for the season was World Championships. For it she announced a goal to finish among best six.

Only two weeks later, on 11 and 12 January, she achieved two second places in the World Cup. It was again on the 5 km and 10 km distances, but this time it was 5 km classic and 10 km free. The race was run in Hakuba, Japan on the tracks ready for 1998 Winter Olympics

On 17 February 2005, she won the 10 km free at the Nordic skiing World Championships. Neumannová defended her 10 km free title at the following championships in Sapporo on 27 February 2007.

On 24 February 2006, in her 20th and final Olympic race, Neumannová won her sixth Olympic medal, but first Winter Olympic gold medal in the 30 km freestyle mass start and became the oldest winner in the event.

On 14 January 2007 Neumannová received the title Czech Sportsperson of the Year 2006, a trophy awarded by journalists in the Czech Republic.

2009 FIS Nordic World Ski Championships
In late 2006, Neumannová was named an honorary vice president of the organizing committee for the FIS Nordic World Ski Championships 2009 in Liberec, the Czech Republic. On 25 July 2007, she succeeded Roman Kumpost as chair of the organizing committee for the 2009 championships.

Cross-country skiing results
All results are sourced from the International Ski Federation (FIS).

Olympic Games
 6 medals – (1 gold, 4 silver, 1 bronze)

World Championships
 5 medals – (2 gold, 1 silver, 2 bronze)

a.  Cancelled due to extremely cold weather.

World Cup

Season standings

Individual podiums
19 victories – (18 , 1 ) 
49 podiums – (48 , 1 )

Team podiums

 1 victory – (1 ) 
 2 podiums – (1 , 1 )

Note:  Until the 1999 World Championships, World Championship races were included in the World Cup scoring system.

Personal life
On 2 July 2003, Neumannová gave birth to a girl named Lucie.

See also
 List of athletes with the most appearances at Olympic Games

References

External links
  
 
 
 Kateřina Neumannová at Czech.cz
 
 
 

Cross-country skiers at the 1992 Winter Olympics
Cross-country skiers at the 1994 Winter Olympics
Cross-country skiers at the 1998 Winter Olympics
Cross-country skiers at the 2002 Winter Olympics
Cross-country skiers at the 2006 Winter Olympics
Cyclists at the 1996 Summer Olympics
Czech female cross-country skiers
Czech female cyclists
Czech mountain bikers
Olympic cross-country skiers of Czechoslovakia
Olympic cross-country skiers of the Czech Republic
Olympic cyclists of the Czech Republic
Olympic gold medalists for the Czech Republic
Olympic silver medalists for the Czech Republic
Olympic bronze medalists for the Czech Republic
Sportspeople from Písek
1973 births
Living people
Recipients of Medal of Merit (Czech Republic)
Olympic medalists in cross-country skiing
FIS Nordic World Ski Championships medalists in cross-country skiing
Medalists at the 2006 Winter Olympics
Medalists at the 2002 Winter Olympics
Medalists at the 1998 Winter Olympics